Braden Murray (born August 17, 1984) is a Canadian born-American former professional ice hockey forward. He last played for HC Lugano of the Swiss National League A (NLA). He was selected 152nd overall in the 2003 NHL Entry Draft by the Los Angeles Kings.

Murray was born in Brandon, Manitoba and raised in Faribault, Minnesota. His father Andy Murray, is the head coach of the Western Michigan Broncos and coached at a number of other teams as well.  Brady grew up in Switzerland, Philadelphia, Hershey, Winnipeg, Calgary, Faribault and Los Angeles. His childhood friends include NHLers Alexander Steen, Zach Parise and Patrick Eaves.

Playing career
He represented the U.S. at the 2004 World Juniors, where he helped the States win gold. He also played hockey at the University of North Dakota, and after two successful years he followed his father who coached in Switzerland and signed with Swiss club, the Rapperswil-Jona Lakers of the Nationalliga A.

In May 2007, he signed an entry-level contract with the Los Angeles Kings. In the 2007–08 season, he made his NHL debut on September 29, 2007 against the Anaheim Ducks in a game played in London, England. On October 12, he scored his first goal against the Boston Bruins. After one season in the Kings organization, Murray opted to return to Switzerland, initially on loan from the Kings, to HC Lugano.

In his seventh season with Lugano in 2014–15, Murray was loaned to fellow NLA club, the Kloten Flyers for the remainder of the season on January 1, 2015.

Career statistics

Regular season and playoffs

International

Awards and honors

References

External links 

1984 births
Living people
American men's ice hockey centers
American sportspeople of Canadian descent
Ice hockey players from Minnesota
EHC Kloten players
Los Angeles Kings draft picks
Los Angeles Kings players
HC Lugano players
Manchester Monarchs (AHL) players
SC Rapperswil-Jona Lakers players
North Dakota Fighting Hawks men's ice hockey players
People from Faribault, Minnesota